On October 19, 2021, a corporate McDonnell Douglas MD-87, registered as N987AK, crashed and caught fire during take-off,  from Houston Executive Airport. Those on board, 18 passengers and three crew members, were safely evacuated out of the aircraft. The aircraft was damaged beyond repair and was subsequently written-off.

Aircraft 

The aircraft was a 33-year-old McDonnell Douglas MD-87, registered as N987AK. It was originally delivered to Finnair in 1988 as OH-LMB. Sold to Aeroméxico in 2000 as N204AM,  it then passed through several other airlines before entering into service in a corporate configuration with 987 Investments LLC, as N987AK, in 2015.

Flight 
The aircraft was on a non-scheduled charter flight from Brookshire, Texas, to Boston, Massachusetts, as the passengers were destined to see the Houston Astros play in Boston vs the Boston Red Sox baseball team in the 2021 American League Championship Series. The aircraft was taking off at 10:00 a.m. from Runway 36 when it overshot the runway, ran into a fence and a powerline before coming to a halt,  from the runway. It immediately caught fire. All 21 occupants onboard escaped from the burning aircraft safely with only two known injuries, both of which were minor. Emergency services took action with fire retardants and successfully controlled the flames from the wreckage. The aircraft burned down with only the tail-section left intact.

Investigation 

The National Transportation Safety Board (NTSB) is investigating the accident. The fire-damaged flight data recorders were retrieved from the wreckage of N987AK. In November, the NTSB revealed that both the aircraft's elevators were found to be jammed in the down position. A similar condition had been found in the crash of Ameristar Charters Flight 9363, an MD-83, four years earlier.

See also 
American Airlines Flight 1420
Ameristar Charters Flight 9363
Caspian Airlines Flight 6936
YAK-Service Flight 9633

References 

Aviation accidents and incidents in the United States in 2021
Aviation accidents and incidents in Texas
Accidents and incidents involving the McDonnell Douglas MD-87
2021 in Texas
Aviation accidents and incidents involving runway overruns